Lee Cha-man (born 30 September 1950, Gimhae) is a former South Korean footballer and football manager who managed for Busan Daewoo Royals and South Korea national team.

He was the member of South Korea U-20 team of 1969 AFC Youth Championship. He also played for South Korea of 1972 AFC Asian Cup as midfielder.

Honours

as Player
South Korea
 AFC Asian Cup Runners-up (1) : 1972
 Merdeka Tournament Winners (1) : 1975

POSCO
 Korea Football League Champions (1) : 1975 Spring

as Manager
South Korea
 Dynasty Cup Winners (1) : 1990

Busan Daewoo Royals
 K League Champions (2) : 1987, 1997
 Afro-Asian Club Championship Winners (1): 1986
 League Cup Winners (1) : 1997
 League Cup (Supplementary Cup)
 Winners (1) : 1998
 Runners-up (1) : 1999
 Korean National Football Championship
 Winners (1) : 1989
 Runners-up (1) : 1988

References

External links
FIFA Player Statistics

1950 births
Living people
Association football midfielders
South Korean footballers
South Korea international footballers
1972 AFC Asian Cup players
People from Gimhae
South Korean football managers
South Korea national football team managers
Busan IPark managers
Gyeongnam FC managers
Sportspeople from South Gyeongsang Province